Protestant Reformers were those theologians whose careers, works and actions brought about the Protestant Reformation of the 16th century.

In the context of the Reformation, Martin Luther was the first reformer (sharing his views publicly in 1517), followed by people like Andreas Karlstadt and Philip Melanchthon at Wittenberg, who promptly joined the new movement. In 1519, Huldrych Zwingli became the first reformer to express a form of the Reformed tradition.

Listed are the most influential reformers only. They are listed by movement, although some reformers (e.g. Martin Bucer) influenced multiple movements.

Notable precursors

According to Edmund Hamer Broadbent, throughout the Middle Ages, there were a number of Christian movements that sought a return to what they perceived as the purity of the Apostolic church and whose teachings foreshadowed Protestant ideas.

 Claudius of Turin
 Gottschalk of Orbais
 Berengar of Tours
 Peter Waldo
 Lorenzo Valla
 Wessel Gansfort
 Girolamo Savonarola
 Jacques Lefèvre d'Étaples
 John Wycliffe
 Jan Hus

Magisterial Reformers
There were a number of key reformers within the Magisterial Reformation, including:

Lutheran
 Martin Luther
 Philipp Melanchthon
 Justus Jonas
 Martin Chemnitz
 Georg Spalatin
 Joachim Westphal
 Andreas Osiander
 Johannes Brenz
 Johannes Bugenhagen
 Andreas Karlstadt, later a Radical Reformer
 Hans Tausen
 Mikael Agricola
 Primož Trubar
 Jiří Třanovský

Reformed
 Huldrych Zwingli
 Martin Bucer
 John Calvin
 Heinrich Bullinger
 Theodore Beza
 William Farel
 John Knox
 Wolfgang Capito
 Johannes Oecolampadius
 Peter Martyr Vermigli
 Leo Jud

Anglican
 Thomas Cranmer
 Thomas Cromwell
 Matthew Parker
 William Tyndale
 Hugh Latimer
 Richard Hooker

Arminian
 Jacobus Arminius

Unitarian
 Ferenc Dávid

Radical Reformers
Important reformers of the Radical Reformation included:

Anabaptist
 Thomas Müntzer
 Zwickau prophets
 John of Leiden
 Menno Simons
 Dirk Willems

Schwenkfelder
 Kaspar Schwenkfeld

Second Front Reformers
There were also a number of people who initially cooperated with the Radical Reformers, but separated from them to form a "Second Front", principally in objection to sacralism. Among these were:

Anabaptist
 Johannes Bünderlin
 Hans Denck
 Christian Entfelder
 Conrad Grebel
 Balthasar Hubmaier
 Felix Manz

Counter Reformers
Roman Catholics who worked against the Protestant Reformation included:

Roman Catholic
 Girolamo Aleandro
 Augustine Alveld
 Thomas Cajetan
 Johann Cochlaeus
 Johann Eck
 Jerome Emser
 Pope Leo X
 John Tetzel
 Thomas More
 Ignatius Loyola
 Francis de Sales
 Pope Paul III
 Pope Pius V
 Charles Borromeo
 Francis Xavier
 Peter Faber
 Diego Laynez

See also
 List of Protestant Reformers (alphabetical)
 Protestantism in Germany

References

Further reading
 George, Timothy. Theology of the Reformers. Nashville, Tenn.: Broadman Press, 1988. . N.B.: Comparative studies of the various leaders of the Magisterial and Radical movements of the 16th century Protestant Reformation.

 
Religious reformers by religion